Joseph Buffington (November 27, 1803 – February 3, 1872) was a Whig member of the U.S. House of Representatives from Pennsylvania.

Joseph Buffington was born in West Chester, Pennsylvania.  He attended the common schools and graduated from Western University of Pennsylvania, now known as the University of Pittsburgh, in 1825.  He moved to Butler County, Pennsylvania, and edited a weekly newspaper.  He studied law, was admitted to the bar in 1826 and commenced practice in Butler.  He moved to Kittanning, Pennsylvania, in 1827 and continued the practice of law.

Buffington was elected as a Whig to the Twenty-eighth and Twenty-ninth Congresses.  He was not a candidate for renomination in 1846.  He was appointed president judge of the eighteenth district in 1849 and served until 1851.  He declined the appointment as chief justice of the Utah Territory tendered by President Millard Fillmore in 1852.  He was judge of the tenth district of Pennsylvania from 1855 until his retirement in 1871.  He died in Kittanning in 1872.  Interment in Kittanning Cemetery.

Sources

The Political Graveyard

1803 births
1872 deaths
Pennsylvania lawyers
Pennsylvania state court judges
University of Pittsburgh alumni
Whig Party members of the United States House of Representatives from Pennsylvania
19th-century American politicians
19th-century American judges
19th-century American lawyers